Compsibidion multizonatum is a species of beetle in the family Cerambycidae. It was described in detail by Martins in 1969.

References

External links
 

Compsibidion
Beetles described in 1969